DYNJ-TV was a UHF free to air television channel, formerly owned and operated by Rajah Broadcasting Network Inc. owned by Ramon "RJ" Jacinto. It is off the air.

Television stations in Cebu City